"Number on My Back / The Baggy Green" is a double A-sided single recorded by Australian country singer John Williamson. The single was released in December 1999 as included as bonus tracks as the third and final single from Williamson's fourteenth studio album The Way It Is and peaked at number 95 on the ARIA Charts.

Williamson suggested to Rod Macqueen the coach of the Australia national rugby union team the song "Waltzing Matilda" may inspire the team; nicknamed "The Wallabies" against the All Blacks. The offer was accepted and on 28 August 1999, Williamson sang "Waltzing Matilda" at Stadium Australia, Sydney in front of a (then) world record rugby crowd of 107,042 people. After being inspired by the Wallabies Williamson wrote and recorded "A Number On My Back".

"The Baggy Green" was written with Gavin Robertson and Steve Waugh and features Waugh on vocals as well as the Boys of The Bankstown District Cricket Association.

Track listing

Charts

Release history

References 

John Williamson (singer) songs
Songs about cricketers
Sporting songs
Cricket music
1999 songs
1999 singles